Shaun Rudman (born 17 February 1978) is a former professional tennis player from South Africa.

Career
Rudman was a doubles specialist and took part in the main draw of the men's doubles event at the 2002 French Open, with David Škoch. They lost in the opening round to the Czech pairing of František Čermák and Ota Fukárek.

The South African won four Challenger doubles titles during his career. His best performance in a top tier tournament came at the 2002 Miller Lite Hall of Fame Championships, where he and partner Brandon Coupe made the quarter-finals.

Currently he is the director of Cygnet Proprietary Trading, a proprietary trading firm in Australia.

Challenger titles

Doubles: (4)

References

External links
 
 

1978 births
Living people
South African male tennis players